The committees of the 12th Supreme People's Assembly (SPA) of North Korea were elected by the 1st Session of the aforementioned body on 9 April 2009. It was replaced on 9 April 2014 by the committees of the 13th Supreme People's Assembly.

Committees

Budget

Legislation

Credentials
Not all members made public.

References

Citations

Bibliography
Books:
 

12th Supreme People's Assembly
2009 establishments in North Korea
2014 disestablishments in North Korea